William Sawyer may refer to:

 William Sawyer (cricketer), 18th-century English cricketer
 William Sawyer (representative), member of the US house of Representatives from Ohio in the 1840s
 William B. Sawyer (1886-1950), Miami doctor
William E. Sawyer, American inventor
 William James Sawyer, English accountant
 William Sawyer (politician), Canadian politician
 William Sawyer (composer) (1953-1991),  author of the musical Babes
 William Collinson Sawyer (1831–1868) Anglican bishop